Gysbert Van Steenwyk, Sr., (birth name: Gijsbert; January 30, 1814April 13, 1902) was a Dutch American immigrant, banker, and Republican politician from La Crosse, Wisconsin.  He was the 4th Bank Comptroller of Wisconsin and served in the Wisconsin State Senate and State Assembly.

Background 
Van Steenwyk was the son of Arnoud van Steenwijk and Neeltje van Vliet and was born in Utrecht, the Netherlands. He served as a volunteer in the Royal Netherlands Army in 1830 and 1831, and as a commissioned officer of the National Guards from 1833 to 1849.  Van Steenwyk graduated from the University of Utrecht in 1836, where he studied philosophy and classical literature.

In the United States 
He came to the United States in May 1849, and settled in Milwaukee until 1851, when he moved to Newport, Sauk County, where he resided until 1858; then removed to Kilbourn City in Columbia County.

Public office 
Van Steenwyk was appointed consul of the Netherlands for Wisconsin in 1849, and additionally for Michigan and Minnesota in 1850 (he resigned as consul in 1859). He was appointed commissioner of immigration for Wisconsin in New York City by Governor of Wisconsin Leonard J. Farwell from 1852 to 1853. He was appointed as a brigadier general of the Wisconsin State Militia in 1857.

Van Steenwyk, at that time was working as a land and insurance agent and living in Kilbourn City (now called Wisconsin Dells), was elected as a Republican member of the Wisconsin State Assembly in 1858 for the 1st Columbia County Assembly district (the Towns of Dekorah, West Point, Newport, Lewiston, Portage, Caledonia, Lodi and Pacific) succeeding Democrat Alvin Alden. He was appointed to the standing committees on education and school and university lands; and on railroads., then was elected state Bank Comptroller for 1860–61, unseating incumbent Democrat Joel Squires. He was succeeded in the Assembly by Democrat Henry B. Munn. He was succeeded as Comptroller by Democrat William H. Ramsey.

After serving as comptroller 
In January 1862, he moved to La Crosse, where he worked as a banker. From 1873 to 1874, Van Steenwyk served as mayor of La Crosse. He was elected senator from the Wisconsin Senate, District 31 (La Crosse County) for 1879–80, receiving 1,849 votes to 747 for Greenback Edward Cronan and 729 for Democrat W. A. Anderson (Republican incumbent Merrick Wing was not a candidate for re-election). He was assigned to the committees on insurance, banks and banking; and on enrolled bills, chairing the latter. He was not a candidate for re-election and was succeeded by Merrick Wing.

References

External links
 

1814 births
1902 deaths
American bankers
Businesspeople from Wisconsin
Dutch emigrants to the United States
Insurance agents
Mayors of La Crosse, Wisconsin
Republican Party members of the Wisconsin State Assembly
Military personnel from Utrecht (city)
American real estate brokers
Royal Netherlands Army personnel
Republican Party Wisconsin state senators
People from Columbia County, Wisconsin
19th-century American politicians
19th-century American businesspeople